Gilles Leroy (born 28 December 1958 in Bagneux, Hauts-de-Seine) is a French writer. He studied at the Lycée Lakanal in Sceaux, which appears in his 1996 novel Les Maîtres du monde as the "Lycée Ducasse". His novel Alabama song won the Prix Goncourt in 2007.

Bibliography
 Novels and short stories
 1987 : Habibi, novel, (Michel de Maule) ;
 1990 : Maman est morte, novel, (Michel de Maule) ;
 1991 : Les Derniers seront les premiers, short story, (Mercure de France) ;
 1992 : Madame X, roman, (Mercure de France) ;
 1994 : Les Jardins publics, novel, (Mercure de France) ;
 1996 : Les Maîtres du monde, novel, (Mercure de France) ;
 1998 : Machines à sous, novel, (Mercure de France) ;
 2000 : Soleil noir, novel, (Mercure de France) ;
 2002 : L'Amant russe, novel, (Mercure de France) ;
 2004 : Grandir, novel, (Mercure de France) ;
 2005 : Champsecret, novel, (Mercure de France) ;
 2007 : Alabama song, novel, (Mercure de France), Goncourt Prize 2007 ;
 2010 : Zola Jackson, novel, (Mercure de France) .

Theatre
 2005 : Le Jour des fleurs,
 SPY, 2008.

See also

 Contemporary French literature
 List of LGBT writers

Awards
 1992 : Prix Nanterre de la nouvelle for Les Derniers seront les premiers.
 1999 : Prix Valery Larbaud for Machines à sous.
 2004 : Prix Millepages, Prix Cabourg for Grandir.
 2005 : Chevalier des Arts et des Lettres.
 2007 : Prix Goncourt for Alabama song.
 2008 : Prix Flaubert des lycéens for Alabama Song.
 2010 : Prix Eté du Livre for Zola Jackson.

References

External links
 Official Website

1958 births
Living people
People from Bagneux, Hauts-de-Seine
20th-century French novelists
21st-century French novelists
Prix Goncourt winners
Prix Valery Larbaud winners
French gay writers
French LGBT novelists
French male essayists
French male novelists
20th-century French essayists
21st-century French essayists
20th-century French male writers
21st-century French male writers